The 2012 Havant Borough Council election took place on 3 May 2012 to elect members of Havant Borough Council in Hampshire, England. One third of the council was up for election and the Conservative Party stayed in overall control of the council.

After the election, the composition of the council was:
Conservative 34
Labour 3
Liberal Democrats 1

Background
Before the election the Conservatives ran the council with 35 seats, compared to 2 for the Liberal Democrats and 1 for Labour. Labour targeted Warren Park, where both seats were held by the Conservatives, but the Conservative councillor Mike Sceal had won the seat at the 2008 election by only 24 votes.

Election result
The Conservatives stayed in strong control of the council after losing just 1 seat. Labour gained 2 seats, one each from the Conservatives and Liberal Democrats, while the other Labour councillor Terry Hart held his seat in Bondfields. Richard Brown gained Warren Park from the Conservative after having lost the seat at the 2010 election, while Ralph Cousins regained Battins from the Liberal Democrats, which reduced the Liberal Democrats to 1 seat on the council. Overall turnout at the election was 27.5%.

Ward results

Barncroft

Battins

Bedhampton

Bondfields

Cowplain

Emsworth

Hart Plain

Hayling East

Hayling West

Purbrook

St. Faiths

Stakes

Warren Park

Waterloo

By-elections between 2012 and 2014

Battins
A by-election took place in Battins ward on 15 November 2012 after Katie Ray resigned from the council. Faith Ponsonby held the seat for the Liberal Democrats by a majority of 264 votes on a turnout of just 18%.

Bedhampton
A by-election took place in Bedhampton ward on 2 May 2013 after the resignation of Conservative councillor Jenny Wride. The seat was held for the Conservatives by David Smith by a majority of 114 votes.

Emsworth
A by-election took place in Emsworth ward on 2 May 2013 after the resignation of the former Conservative council leader David Gillett. The seat was held for the Conservatives by Colin Mackey by a majority of 692 votes.

Waterloo
A by-election took place in Waterloo ward on 24 October 2013 after the resignation of Conservative councillor John Hunt. The seat was held for the Conservatives by Peter Wade by a majority of 237 votes.

References

2012 English local elections
Havant Borough Council elections
2010s in Hampshire